Cape Maisí or Cape Maysí is a cape at the eastern extremity of Cuba, projecting into the Windward Passage. It lies in the municipality of Maisí, Guantánamo Province.

See also
 Punta Maisí Lighthouse
 Cape San Antonio

Notes

References
 Merriam-Webster's Geographical Dictionary, Third Edition. Springfield, Massachusetts: Merriam-Webster, Incorporated, 1997.

Maisi
Geography of Guantánamo Province